Albert Jeffrey Hosking (27 July 1885 – 14 April 1953) was an Australian rules footballer who played for the St Kilda Football Club in the Victorian Football League (VFL).

Notes

External links 

1885 births
1953 deaths
Australian rules footballers from Melbourne
St Kilda Football Club players